Mehdi Qoli Khan Shamlu was a Turkoman military officer from the Shamlu tribe, who briefly served as the Safavid governor of Bia-pish (eastern Gilan) from 1592 to 1593.

After the fall of the Kia'i dynasty, shah Abbas I appointed Mehdi Qoli Khan as the governor of Bia-pish, while Ali Beg Sultan was appointed as the governor of Bia-pas (western Gilan). One year later, however, Mehdi Qoli Khan was dismissed by the shah due to his bad management of the province. He is thereafter no longer mentioned.

Sources
 
 

Safavid generals
Year of death unknown
16th-century births
Iranian Turkmen people
Shamlu
Safavid governors in Gilan
16th-century people of Safavid Iran